Magnasee is a product used to visualize the magnetic fields recorded onto magnetic recording media such as magnetic tape, diskettes, and the like.

The product contains very fine colloidal iron in a fast-evaporating liquid such as naphtha or fluorocarbons. The liquid is first agitated vigorously to disperse the iron. It may then be carefully poured over the magnetic media of, in the case of tape, the tape may be dipped into the open container of liquid. The iron adheres between the magnetic domains of the media, allowing the user to see where these magnetic domains have been written. Allowing the carrier liquid to evaporate allows very close visualization of the domains.

Various faults in the magnetic recording process could then be visually detected. These included:

 Track mis-alignments including gross azimuth errors
 Missing (unrecorded) tracks
 Failures of the erasure system
 Lift-off of the media from the recording head(s)
 After-the fact destruction of the recording via, say, the application of external magnets

For many older systems that recorded at a low linear bit density, the bit density of the recording could be determined.

While Magnasee was most commonly used on magnetic media that wasn't meant to be re-used (for reading or writing), careful cleaning could remove the iron particles and allow critical media to be re-used.

References
 Magnetic Recording Handbook, Marvin Camras, Springer 1988, 

Magnetic devices